The Kemnal Academies Trust is a multi-academy trust serving a family of schools mainly in Kent and West Sussex.

Academies

Secondary
    Havant Academy
    Kemnal Technology College
    Orchards Academy
    The Academy, Selsey
    King Harold Business & Enterprise Academy
    Rainham School for Girls
    Debden Park High School
Hylands School
Miltoncross Academy
Cleeve Park School
Shenstone School
Welling School 
Bridgemary School
Chichester High School
    Thomas Bennett Community College

Primary
    Ore Village Primary Academy
Cleeve Meadow School
    Pebsham Primary Academy
    Heybridge Primary School
    Maldon Primary School
    Stapleford Abbotts
    Willow Brook Primary School and Nursery
    Front Lawn Primary Academy
    Dame Janet Primary Academy
    Drapers Mills Primary Academy
    East Wickham Primary Academy
    Gray's Farm Primary Academy
    Horizon Primary Academy
    Napier Community Primary and Nursery Academy
    Newlands Primary School
    Northdown Primary School
    Pluckley C of E Primary School
    Royal Park Primary Academy
    Salmestone Primary School
    Smarden Primary School
    Weyfield Primary Academy
    Broadfield Primary Academy
    Hilltop Primary School
    Portfield Primary Academy
    Seal Primary Academy
    Seymour Primary School
    Tangmere Primary Academy
    The Bewbush Academy
   The Mill Primary Academy
    The Oaks Primary School

References

Multi-academy trusts